The  is an ongoing concert tour by hard rock band Guns N' Roses.

Background
After a one-off show on January 31, 2020, in Miami in conjunction with Super Bowl LIV, the band was slated to tour Central and South America  in March and April.

On February 6, 2020, a tour with The Smashing Pumpkins as openers was planned for several dates in July 2020; The first tour date took place as scheduled on March 14, 2020, in Mexico City as part of the Vive Latino Festival (where they return to play "So Fine" with Duff McKagan on vocals, which has not happened since 1993), in spite of the rapid advance of the COVID-19 pandemic.  Although it was announced two days later on March 16, 2020, that the remaining Latin American dates had been postponed until October through December 2020, the shows would later be postponed indefinitely. On May 11, 2020, the band announced on Twitter that the European leg of the tour, which was originally scheduled to begin on May 20 in Lisbon, Portugal, had been cancelled.

On May 20, 2020, the band announced that the North American leg of the tour was "being rescheduled out of an abundance of caution." The postponed leg was originally slated to begin on July 4 in Milwaukee and end on August 26 in Missoula, Montana.

The now-cancelled August 8 appearance at SoFi Stadium in the Los Angeles area would have been (in addition to being the band's return to their home town) the first rock and roll show at the new stadium.

On November 19, 2020, the band announced 8 new Oceania dates. The Oceania tour is scheduled to begin on November 6, 2021, in Gold Coast, Australia, before wrapping things up on November 24, 2021, in Perth, Australia. The Toronto date for July 26 was cancelled on June 1, 2021.

On August 3, 2021, at Fenway Park in Boston, the band played "Absurd", a reworking of the song "Silkworms" from the Chinese Democracy sessions, performed live four times back in 2001.

After the band's show at Wrigley Field on September 16, 2021, Rose released a statement saying he was suffering from food poisoning during the show, however he performed the show in full.

On September 24, 2021, the band releases "Hard Skool", another reworking of a song from the Chinese Democracy sessions, and played live on September 26, 2021, in Royal Farms Arena in Baltimore. The song had been rumored to be released and had been played at soundchecks in 2019, 2020 (at the band's last show before the pandemic, with Rose present) and 2021.

According to figures reported to Billboard Boxscore, the U.S. leg of the Guns N' Roses 2021 Tour grossed $50 million and sold 363,000 tickets.

On September 9, 2022, Axl Rose apologized on his Twitter account for the concert held at Rock In Rio in Rio de Janeiro. On his account, he wrote that: "I want to apologize for being a bit under the weather, thankful not Covid. I tried to keep my cough between lines. Love you. Thank you to the fans and Rock in Rio for everything and what a fucking great crowd."

Tour dates

Cancelled dates

Personnel

Guns N' Roses
Axl Rose – lead vocals, piano, percussion
Slash – lead guitar, talkbox, slide guitar
Duff McKagan – bass, backing vocals, lead vocals
Dizzy Reed – keyboards, piano, percussion, backing vocals
Richard Fortus – rhythm guitar, backing vocals
Frank Ferrer – drums, percussion
Melissa Reese – keyboards, synthesizers, sub-bass, sampling, percussion, backing vocals

Guests
P!nk – vocals during the song "Patience" (September 4, 2021)
Dave Grohl – vocals and guitar during the song "Paradise City" (September 4, 2021)
Wolfgang Van Halen – guitar and vocals during the song "Paradise City" (October 2, 2021 & October 3, 2021)
Carrie Underwood - vocals during the songs "Sweet Child o' Mine" and "Paradise City" (July 1 & 2, 2022)

Notes

References

2021 concert tours
2022 concert tours
2023 concert tours
Guns N' Roses concert tours
Concert tours postponed due to the COVID-19 pandemic